Archduchess Louise of Austria (2 September 1870, in Salzburg – 23 March 1947, in Brussels) was by marriage Crown Princess of Saxony as the wife of the future King Frederick Augustus III.

Life

Crown Princess of Saxony
Louise was born on 2 September 1870, the second child of Ferdinand IV, the last Grand Duke of Tuscany and his second wife, Princess Alice of Bourbon-Parma. Through her mother, she was a great-great-granddaughter of Charles X of France.

At 17 she attracted the attention of potential suitors, among them Prince Pedro Augusto of Saxe-Coburg and Gotha (grandson of Emperor Pedro II of Brazil) or Prince Ferdinand of Bulgaria, but none appealed to her. In the summer of 1887 at Pillnitz Castle she met Prince Frederick Augustus of Saxony (eldest son of Prince George, who became King of Saxony in June 1902). They married at Vienna on 21 November 1891, in a lavish ceremony which cost the groom the sum of 20,000 marks. In return, Louise fulfilled her royal duties, and bore him six children; however, she did not follow etiquette at the strict Dresden court, which resulted in arguments with her father-in-law, the Interior Minister Georg von Metzsch-Reichenbach, and her sister-in-law Princess Mathilde.

As her popularity among the people by far exceeded that of the rest of the Saxon Royal Family, they made her life difficult with big and small intrigues. Soon rumors began to circulate that Louise had had an affair with a dentist named O'Brian and with her children's French tutor, André Giron. In desperation, she sent a telegram to Giron, which was intercepted by the secret police and it turned out that she had actually begun an affair with him. This was discussed by her biographer Erika Bestenreiner, who described the French tutor as a slender black-haired man with a small dark mustache, of a lively nature, with perfect manners and good taste in clothes.

Scandal
Threatened by her father-in-law with being interned in a mental asylum at the Sonnenstein Castle for life, on 9 December 1902 and with the help of two of her maids, sisters Sidonie and Maria Beeger – daughters of the royal court architect Eduard Beeger – Louise (pregnant with her seventh child) fled from Dresden towards Lake Geneva, where André Giron was waiting for her. At first, in the Saxon court, it was believed that this trip was for recreation, but she had arranged to meet her elder brother Archduke Leopold Ferdinand of Austria, who had begun a liaison with (and shortly after married) Wilhelmine Adamović, a prostitute and daughter of a postman. Three days after their arrival, the Beeger sisters left Geneva. In the meantime, André Giron (who was with Louise's brother) contacted a notary in Brussels to lay a false trail to the Belgian capital. However, the siblings were identified at Geneva a few days later.

The escape of the Crown Princess of Saxony was the first scandal of the German nobility in the 20th century, especially hurtful for the staunchly Catholic Saxon Royal Family. The conservative Baroness Hildegard von Spitzemberg noted in her diary:

Hermione von Preuschen, on the other hand, answered the “Louise Question” put to several women writers by the Neues Wiener Journal as follows:

Alice Gurschner said simply:

Without consulting his son, King George of Saxony officially declared the civil divorce of the Crown Princely couple on 11 February 1903 by a special court, which he had set up on 31 December 1902. One year later, on 15 October 1904, the Saxon monarch died after forcing his son, the new King Frederick Augustus III, to bar her from returning to the Dresden court. In Geneva, the former Crown Princess led a happy life and even dared to show up with her lover in public, but unexpectedly a few days before the divorce was declared she separated from Giron for unknown reasons.

The paternity of her daughter Anna Monika Pia, born on 4 May 1903 at Lindau remained unclear. The Saxon court sent the director of the Dresden maternity hospital, Dr. Leopold, to Lindau to examine her and establish her true parentage. Due to her physical appearance and the bright colour of eyes and hair, he declared that the Crown Prince was her father, but refused to admit further medical opinions. She was therefore recognized by Frederick Augustus as his own. King George gave Louise an allowance and granted her the title of Countess of Montignoso (in allusion of her Tuscan ascendancy) on 13 July 1903; in turn, he demanded that Anna Monika Pia be sent to Dresden to be raised with the other royal children, but Louise adamantly refused.

Later life
Louise lived firstly at Ramo Castle near Lyon, then in 1903 at Ventnor Castle on  the Isle of Wight. In 1904 she and her family moved to the Bourbon-Parma family seat of Wartegg Castle on Lake Constance, and later to Florence. On 21 December 1904 she tried to see her older children at the Dresden Taschenbergpalais, but her attempts were unsuccessful because the police had surrounded the building. Later, she traveled in the company of her new lover, Conte Carlo Guicciardi, who lived separately from his wife but was still married.

Both Louise and her lover thought to return 2-year-old Anna Monika Pia to the Saxon court, but after an increase of the child's allowance from 30,000 to 40,000 marks was negotiated Louise changed her mind and refused to send her daughter to Dresden.

In London on 25 September 1907 Louise married the Italian musician Enrico Toselli, 12 years younger than she. They had one son, Carlo Emmanuele Filiberto, born on 7 May 1908. Shortly after her wedding (26 October 1907), King Frederick Augustus III finally located Anna Monika Pia, who was sent to Dresden to live with her siblings and be raised as a member of the Saxon royal house. In 1908 Louise separated from Toselli, and they divorced in 1912; their son remained with his father.

In 1911, Louise broke her silence and published a memoir blaming her disgrace on her late father-in-law and Saxon politicians, who she claimed feared that, when she became queen, she would use her influence to dismiss them from office. Throughout the book, My Own Story, she claimed that her popularity exceeded that of her father-in-law, King George of Saxony, and her husband, the future king. Louise implied that her popularity had alienated her from the royal family and politicians. She was indeed popular with the Saxon people. She ascribed her popularity to her insistence on ignoring the etiquette of the Saxon court and, perhaps to cast herself as a victim, compared herself with her Habsburg relative, Marie Antoinette, who disliked court rituals at Versailles and, like Louise, had avoided the noble courtiers who depended on those rituals to affirm their places at court.

After the Habsburg monarchy collapsed in 1918, Louise called herself "Antoinette Maria, Comtesse d'Ysette"; after some time in Mallorca with her uncle Archduke Ludwig Salvator of Austria, she moved to Brussels, where she initially lived in the suburb of Ixelles. Stripped of her imperial titles and dignities after her second marriage, she could no longer bear the surname of Habsburg. After the German invasion ended the little support that she received from some relatives, she suddenly became penniless. She died in poverty as a flower seller on 23 March 1947. Her urn was deposited in the Hedingen monastery in Sigmaringen, the burial place of the House of Hohenzollern, where a number of her children are buried nearby, including her son Prince Ernst Heinrich. Her estate is found in the Central State Archive of Dresden.

Children
From first marriage:
 Friedrich August Georg, Crown Prince of Saxony (15 January 1893 – 14 May 1943). A priest, he renounced his rights in 1923.
 Friedrich Christian (31 December 1893 – 9 August 1968). Married Princess Elisabeth Helene of Thurn and Taxis and had issue.
 Ernst Heinrich (9 December 1896 – 14 June 1971). Married first Princess Sophie of Luxembourg and second Virginia Dulon (1910–2002) in 1947 (morganatically). Had issue with Sophie.
 Maria Alix Karola (stillborn 22 August 1898).
 Margarete Karola Wilhelmine Viktoria Adelheid Albertine Petrusa Bertram Paula (24 January 1900 – 16 October 1962). Married Friedrich, Prince of Hohenzollern.
 Maria Alix Luitpolda Anna Henriette Germana Agnes Damiana Michaela (27 September 1901 – 11 December 1990). Married Franz Joseph, Prince of Hohenzollern-Emden.
 Anna Monika Pia (4 May 1903 – 8 February 1976). Married firstly Joseph Franz, Archduke of Austria and secondly Reginald Kazanjian.

From second marriage:
 Carlo Emmanuele Filiberto Toselli (7 May 1908 – 24 July 1969).

Honours
 : Dame of the Order of the Starry Cross, 1st Class
 : Dame of the Order of Queen Maria Luisa, 12 November 1891

Ancestry

References

Bibliography
 Almanach de Gotha. Annuaire généalogique diplomatique et statistique, Dieterich u. a., Gotha 1.1764 - 181.1944 (editions 1887 and 1931)
 Louisa of Tuscany: My Own Story, Eveleigh Nash, London 1911.
 Luise von Österreich-Toskana: Mein Lebensweg, ed. Kunst, Dresden 2001, 
 Erika Bestenreiner: Luise von Toskana. Skandal am Königshof, Piper, Munich 2000,

External links

 
 Luise, Crown Princess of Saxony

1870 births
1947 deaths
Austrian princesses
Saxon princesses
House of Habsburg-Lorraine
People from Salzburg
Austrian Roman Catholics
Crown Princesses of Saxony
⚭Archduchess Louise of Austria
Daughters of monarchs